In fluid dynamics, turbulence kinetic energy (TKE) is the mean kinetic energy per unit mass associated with eddies in turbulent flow. Physically, the turbulence kinetic energy is characterised by measured root-mean-square (RMS) velocity fluctuations. In the Reynolds-averaged Navier Stokes equations, the turbulence kinetic energy can be calculated based on the closure method, i.e. a turbulence model.

Generally, the TKE is defined to be half the sum of the variances (square of standard deviations) of the velocity components:

TKE can be produced by fluid shear, friction or buoyancy, or through external forcing at low-frequency eddy scales (integral scale). Turbulence kinetic energy is then transferred down the turbulence energy cascade, and is dissipated by viscous forces at the Kolmogorov scale. This process of production, transport and dissipation can be expressed as:

where:

  is the mean-flow material derivative of TKE;
  is the turbulence transport of TKE;
  is the production of TKE, and
  is the TKE dissipation.

Assuming that molecular viscosity is constant, and making the Boussinesq approximation, the TKE equation is:

By examining these phenomena, the turbulence kinetic energy budget for a particular flow can be found.

Computational fluid dynamics

In computational fluid dynamics (CFD), it is impossible to numerically simulate turbulence without discretizing the flow-field as far as the Kolmogorov microscales, which is called direct numerical simulation (DNS). Because DNS simulations are exorbitantly expensive due to memory, computational and storage overheads, turbulence models are used to simulate the effects of turbulence. A variety of models are used, but generally TKE is a fundamental flow property which must be calculated in order for fluid turbulence to be modelled.

Reynolds-averaged Navier–Stokes equations
Reynolds-averaged Navier–Stokes (RANS) simulations use the Boussinesq eddy viscosity hypothesis  to calculate the Reynolds stress that results from the averaging procedure:

where 

The exact method of resolving TKE depends upon the turbulence model used; – (k–epsilon) models assume isotropy of turbulence whereby the normal stresses are equal:

This assumption makes modelling of turbulence quantities ( and ) simpler, but will not be accurate in scenarios where anisotropic behaviour of turbulence stresses dominates, and the implications of this in the production of turbulence also leads to over-prediction since the production depends on the mean rate of strain, and not the difference between the normal stresses (as they are, by assumption, equal).

Reynolds-stress models (RSM) use a different method to close the Reynolds stresses, whereby the normal stresses are not assumed isotropic, so the issue with TKE production is avoided.

Initial conditions
Accurate prescription of TKE as initial conditions in CFD simulations are important to accurately predict flows, especially in high Reynolds-number simulations. A smooth duct example is given below.

The turbulent length scale can be estimated as

with  a characteristic length. For internal flows this may take the value of the inlet duct (or pipe) width (or diameter) or the hydraulic diameter.

References

External links
 Turbulence kinetic energy at CFD Online.

Computational fluid dynamics
Turbulence
Energy (physics)